Reginald Claypoole Vanderbilt (January 14, 1880 – September 4, 1925) was a member of the Vanderbilt family. He was the father of Gloria Vanderbilt and maternal grandfather of Anderson Cooper. An avid equestrian, Vanderbilt was the founder and president of many equestrian organizations. He gambled away most of his inheritance.

Early life
Reginald Claypoole Vanderbilt was born on January 14, 1880, in Manhattan, New York.  He was the youngest son of Cornelius Vanderbilt II (1843–1899) and Alice Claypoole Gwynne (1845–1934).  Among his siblings was Gertrude Vanderbilt (1875–1942), who married Harry Payne Whitney, Alfred Gwynne Vanderbilt (1877–1915), and Gladys Moore Vanderbilt (1886–1965), who married Count László Széchenyi.

Reginald was a grandson of William Henry Vanderbilt (1821–1885), and great-grandson of Commodore Cornelius Vanderbilt (1794–1877).

He attended Yale University, but did not graduate. One elder brother, Cornelius Vanderbilt III (1873–1942), married Grace Wilson against his parents' wishes and was disinherited. Another elder brother, Alfred, inherited the bulk of the family fortune, though Reginald and several sisters also received some inheritance.

Personal life and death

In 1903, Reginald married Cathleen Neilson (1885–1927) at Parker Cottage in Newport, Rhode Island. She was the daughter of Isabelle Gebhard Neilson, the niece of Frederick Gebhard (c. 1860–1910), and the great-granddaughter of Thomas E. Davis, a prominent New York real estate developer. Before their divorce in 1920, the couple had one daughter: Cathleen Vanderbilt (1904–1944), who married Henry Cooke Cushing III (1895–1960) in 1923. After their divorce in 1932, she married broadcasting executive Lawrence Wise Lowman (1900–1980) in 1932. They divorced that same year and in 1940, she married for the third and final time to Martin Arostegui, a publisher in Havana, Cuba.

On March 6, 1923, he married Gloria Mercedes Morgan (1904–1965). Together, they were the parents of his second daughter: Gloria Laura Vanderbilt (1924–2019), the fashion designer. She married Pasquale DiCicco (1909–1978) in 1941. They divorced in 1945 and that same year she married Leopold Anthony Stokowski (1882–1977). They divorced in 1955 and a year later, in 1956, she married Sidney Arthur Lumet (1924–2011). In 1963, they also divorced and, that same year, she married Wyatt Emory Cooper (1927–1978).

Reginald Claypoole Vanderbilt died from cirrhosis due to alcoholism on September 4, 1925, at his country home, Sandy Point Farm, in Portsmouth, Rhode Island. In his will, he left the vast majority of his estate to his daughters with a residue to his widow, which was not to exceed $1,125,000 and his New York townhouse, located at 12 East 77th Street, and Sandy Point Farm. He is buried in the Vanderbilt Family Cemetery and Mausoleum in Staten Island, New York.

Descendants
Through his eldest daughter, Vanderbilt was the grandfather of Henry Cooke Cushing IV (1924–2000), who was married to Georgia Walters "Georgette Windsor" (b. 1924), Ruth Swift Dunbar (1932–2010), Rosalba Neri (b. 1939), and Laura Alvarez.

Through his daughter Gloria, Reginald is the maternal grandfather of Leopold Stanislaus Stokowski (b. 1950), who married Ivy Strick and Emily Goldstein (b 1964), Christopher Stokowski (b. 1952), Carter Vanderbilt Cooper (1965–1988), and Anderson Hays Cooper (b. 1967), the television news anchor.

References

1880 births
1925 deaths
Reginald Claypoole
American people of Dutch descent
American people of English descent
American people of Welsh descent
Deaths from cirrhosis
Drug-related deaths in Rhode Island
Burials at the Vanderbilt Family Cemetery and Mausoleum